Lincoln was a federal electoral district represented in the House of Commons of Canada from 1867 to 1883 and from 1904 to 1997. It was on the Niagara Peninsula in the Canadian province of Ontario. At various times, there was also an electoral district of the same name used in provincial elections.

At various times, the riding included all or parts of the former Lincoln County (including its successor, the Regional Municipality of Niagara). After 1976, it also represented parts of the Regional Municipality of Hamilton-Wentworth, mainly Stoney Creek. As a suburban riding of Hamilton, it tended to vote Conservative much more often than the city proper.

By the 1997 election, the riding borders and name were changed to Stoney Creek although it included many areas outside that city.

Geography
It initially consisted of the Townships of Clinton, Grantham, Grimsby, and Louth, and the Town of St. Catharines. It was abolished in 1882 when it was redistributed between Lincoln and Niagara and Wentworth South ridings.

It was recreated from those two ridings in 1903, and defined as consisting of the County of Lincoln.

In 1947, it was defined as consisting of the county of Lincoln, including the city of St. Catharines.

In 1966, it was defined as consisting of

(a) in the County of Lincoln, the southeast part of the City of St. Catharines, and the Townships of Caistor, Clinton, Gainsborough, Grimsby North, Grimsby South, Louth and Niagara;

(b) in the County of Welland, the Townships of Pelham and Thorold.

In 1976, it was defined as consisting of:

(a) in the Regional Municipality of Hamilton-Wentworth, the Town of Stoney Creek and the part of the City of Hamilton east of Red Hill Creek between Windermere Road in the north and the brow of the Mountain and the limit of the City of Hamilton in the south, and
(b) in the Regional Municipality of Niagara, the Towns of Grimsby and Lincoln.

In 1987, the City of Hamilton part of the ridings was redefined to consist of the part of the city south of Queenston Road, east of Redhill Creek and north of the brow of the Niagara Escarpment.

It was abolished in 1996 when it was redistributed between Erie—Lincoln and Stoney Creek ridings.

Members of Parliament

This riding has elected the following Members of Parliament:

Electoral history

Lincoln, 1867–1882

Lincoln, 1904–1997

External links
Parliamentary website (first riding)
Parliamentary website (second riding)

Former federal electoral districts of Ontario